Ocean Drive may refer to:

Locations
Ocean Drive Beach, a community in South Carolina that is now a part of the city of North Myrtle Beach
Streets:
Ocean Drive (South Beach) in South Beach, Miami Beach, Florida
Ocean Drive (New Jersey), a road along the Atlantic Ocean from Atlantic City to Cape May in New Jersey, USA
Ocean Drive along the south shore of Newport, Rhode Island, also the Ocean Drive Historic District, a U.S. National Historic Landmark
Ocean Drive (North Myrtle Beach), in South Carolina

Music
Ocean Drive (band), French electro band
Ocean Drive (album), a 1996 album by the Lighthouse Family
"Ocean Drive" (Lighthouse Family song)
Ocean Drive, the debut album from Johntá Austin
"Ocean Drive" (Duke Dumont song)
"Ocean Drive," a single by electronica duo Madison Park
"Ocean Drive," a single by rapper 21 Savage from the EP Savage Mode

Others
Ocean Drive (magazine), fashion and lifestyle magazine based in South Florida
A drop-top concept version of the Mercedes-Benz S-Class (W221)

See also
"Ocean Drive Avenue", a single from French reality television series Les Anges